José Dante P. Pascual, known professionally as Juan Rodrigo, is a Filipino stage, film and television actor, singer and model.

Personal life and career
Rodrigo was discovered by his former talent manager Boy De Guia. He started as a dancer, became a Karilagan model and stage actor, then became a film actor. He is the first actor that was launched in the telenovelas like Mara Clara and Mula sa Puso. Rodrigo did films with Nora Aunor like Annie Batungbakal (1979), Bongga Ka Day (1980), and Ang Totoong Buhay ni Pacita M. (1992), among others. He also appeared in movies such as Kisapmata (1981) with Charo Santos, Haplos (1982) with Vilma Santos, Ang Babaeng Nawawala Sa Sarili (1989) with Dina Bonnevie, Hindi Palulupig (1989) starring Lito Lapid, Bawal Na Gamot with Romnick Sarmenta, and Mga Batang Bangketa (2006) with Camille Prats. He received an award of FAMAS Best Supporting Actor 1982 for the movie Moral.

In 1988, Rodrigo was cast in two action films titled Dugo sa Bawat Punglo and Kumander Nelson.
   
Rodrigo studied BS Chemistry, at Far Eastern University. He was a former product analyst of Unilever.

Filmography

Film
Annie Batungbakal (1979)
Aliw (1979)
Pader at Rehas (1980)
Palawan (1980)
Esmeralda at Ruby (1980)
Bongga Ka Day (1980)
Taga sa Panahon (1980)
Tondo Girl (1981)
Caught in the Act (1981)
Kisapmata (1981)
Rock N' Roll (1981)
Schoolgirls (1982)
Haplos (1982)
Moral (1982)
Gabi Kung Sumikat ang Araw (1983)
Bago Kumalat ang Kamandag (1983)
Apoy sa Inyong Kandungan (1984)
Sampung Ahas ni Eva (1984)
Lihim sa Likod ng Buwan (1985)
Ulo ng Gang-ho (1985)
God Save Me! (1985)
Moises Padilla Story: The Missing Chapter (1985)
Hindi Palulupig (1989)
Ipaglalaban Ko (1989)
Dear Diary (1989)
Ang Babaeng Nawawala sa Sarili (1989)
Pangarap Na Ginto (1990)
Lumaban Ka... Sagot Kita (1990)
Andrea, Paano Ba ang Maging Isang Ina? (1990)
Anak ng Cabron: Ikalawang Ugat (1991)
Ang Totoong Buhay ni Pacita M. (1992)
Canary Brothers of Tondo (1992)
Secret Love (1993)
Tikboy Tikas at Mga Khroaks Boys (1993)
Gaano Kita Kamahal (1993) Boy Suclad
Bawal Na Gamot (1994)
Mara Clara: The Movie (1996)
Ako Ba ang Nasa Puso Mo?  (1997)
Matrikula (1997)
Mula sa Puso: The Movie (1999)
Kiss Mo 'Ko (1999)
Biktima: Campus Coed (2003)
Mga Batang Bangketa (2006)
Eternity (2006)
Green Paradise (2007)
Iisang Lahi: Pearl of the Orient Seas (2008)
Ang Sugo sa Huling Araw (not specific)
Four Sisters and a Wedding (2013) as Caloy Salazar (voice and photo appearances only)
Lorna (2014)
Ex with Benefits (2015)
Upline Downline (2015)

Theatre
Mirandolina (1982)
Lorenzo Ruiz (1989)

Television

Footnotes

Discography
It's About Time (Album)
Pangako
Walang Kasing Sarap
Close To Forever
Kabayan Huwag Kang Mag-alala

References

External links

Juan Rodrigo official facebook

Living people
20th-century Filipino male actors
20th-century Filipino male singers
21st-century Filipino male actors
21st-century Filipino male singers
ABS-CBN personalities
Filipino male film actors
Filipino male models
Filipino male stage actors
Filipino male television actors
Far Eastern University alumni
GMA Network personalities
Year of birth missing (living people)